Diseñando tu amor (English title: The Thread of Love) is a Mexican telenovela that premiered on Las Estrellas and Univision on 26 April 2021. It ended on Las Estrellas on 8 October 2021. The series is produced by Pedro Ortiz de Pinedo. It is an adaptation of the Portuguese telenovela Meu Amor created by António Barreira, and stars an ensemble cast led by Gala Montes, Juan Diego Covarrubias, Sergio Goyri, Ana Belena, Osvaldo de León, and María Sorté. The series revolves around Valentina (Gala Montes) and Nora (Ale Müller), two sisters, with different personalities, who share the desire to stand out in the world of the fashion industry.

Plot 
Valentina (Gala Montes) is a young woman who dreams of succeeding in the world of fashion. She works in a pasteurizing factory belonging to Ricardo's (Chris Pazcal) family, who makes her believe that he will help her fulfill her dream, but only wants to take advantage of her and has put a large sum of money in her name, which he has stolen from his father (Marco Muñóz). Valentina and Ricardo's plan to escape is discovered, which will condemn Ricardo to take a trip alongside his father Armando, a successful businessman who does not forgive the betrayal of his son and who threatens to send him to jail as well as his accomplice. Unfortunately the trip turns into a tragedy as the plane suffers an accident. Ricardo loses his memory, disappears and is presumed dead. After losing her boyfriend as well as her father (Adalberto Parra) in the accident, Valentina and her sister Nora (Ale Müller) will arrive to Mexico 
City looking for their uncle Horacio (José Elías Moreno), where they meet Claudio (Juan Diego Covarrubias), Horacio's adoptive son. Claudio is a noble man who as a lawyer will help the members of his community with the legal problems they will face. Immediately the flame of love will light between Valentina and Claudio after meeting, but Nora will try to get in the way to win over Claudio. Valentina tries to make it on her own and find a job at the fashion house of Yolanda Pratas (Frances Ondiviela), a famous designer. Valentina shows great talent but due to her naivety, she allows her designs to be stolen and is fired. Claudio discovers Valentina's ability to design and takes her to Helena's (Ana Belena) workshop, without imagining that a family mystery will unite them for life. Ricardo recovers his memory and looks for Valentina, surprising everyone with the news that he did not die in the tragic plane crash, however is revealed to have his own agenda with Valentina.

Cast

Main 
 Gala Montes as Valentina Fuentes Barrios
 Juan Diego Covarrubias as Claudio Barrios
 Sergio Goyri as Guillermo Vargas Mota
 Ana Belena as Helena Vargas Reyna
 Osvaldo de León as Héctor Casanova Morales
 María Sorté as Consuelo Morales
 Martha Julia as Patricia Manrique de Castro
 Norma Herrera as Adelaida Vargas Villaponte
 Ale Müller as Nora Fuentes Barrios
 Omar Germenos as Alfonso Vargas Reyna
 Frances Ondiviela as Yolanda Pratas
 Chris Pazcal as Ricardo Manrique de Castro
 Armando Araiza as Enrique Avilés Ortega
 Adrián Di Monte as Leonardo Casanova Morales
 Adalberto Parra as Juan Fuentes
 Mariluz Bermúdez as Rosa María Ponce
 Marco Muñóz as Armando Manrique de Castro
 Daniela Álvarez as María José "Majo" Arriaga
 Ana Lorena Elorduy as Camila Casanova Morales
 Alejandra Jurado as Madre Superiora
 Archie Lanfranco as Ernesto
 Talia Rivera as Luna
 Raúl Orvañanos as Uriel
 Isabela Vázquez as Mina Casanova
 José Elías Moreno as Horacio Barrios

Recurring 
 Natalia Madera as Beba
 Bibelot Mansur as Samara
 Emmanuel Torres as Chango
 Alfonso Escobedo as Bicho
 Diego Arancivia as El Cachas
 Carlos Meza as Mosquito
 Sergio Arturo Ruiz as El Perro
 Moisés Peñaloza as Brochas
 Carlos Miguel as Regino
 Manrique Ferrer as Cibernético
 Thabata González as Lucha
 Marcos Neta as Arcadio
 Flora Fernández as Mechita
 Tabata Campos as Lizia

Production 
The telenovela was announced on 15 October 2020 at Visión21 upfront. The cast was revealed in January 2021. Production began on 28 January 2021, and ended on 11 August 2021.

Ratings

Mexico ratings

U.S. ratings 
  
}}

Episodes

Notes

References

External links 
 

2021 telenovelas
2021 Mexican television series debuts
2021 Mexican television series endings
2020s Mexican television series
Televisa telenovelas
Mexican telenovelas
Spanish-language telenovelas
Mexican television series based on Portuguese television series
2021 American television series debuts